Cristina Danielle Valenzuela (born July 11, 1987), known by her stage name Cristina Vee, is an American voice actress and voice director. She provides voices for English dubs of anime, animation, and video games.

Vee's roles in anime include Louise in The Familiar of Zero, Nanoha Takamachi in the Magical Girl Lyrical Nanoha series, Mio Akiyama in K-On!, Noel Vermillion in BlazBlue Alter Memory, Nagisa Saitō in Squid Girl, Homura Akemi in Puella Magi Madoka Magica, Compa in Hyperdimension Neptunia, Rei Hino / Sailor Mars in the Viz Media dub of Sailor Moon, the Honoka sisters in Knights of Sidonia, Hawk from The Seven Deadly Sins, Darkness in Konosuba, Thoma in The Promised Neverland, Meiko Mochizuki in Digimon Adventure tri., Killua Zoldyck in Hunter × Hunter, Yuko Tani in Godzilla: Planet of the Monsters, Godzilla: City on the Edge of Battle, and Godzilla: The Planet Eater, Vivy in Vivy: Fluorite Eye's Song, and Robyn Hill in RWBY.

Vee has also voiced video game roles, such as the titular character and her arch-nemesis Risky Boots in the Shantae series, Velvet Crowe in Tales of Berseria, Riven in League of Legends, 5-Volt in the Warioware series, and Cerebella in Skullgirls. She also plays a minor role as the voice of Vibrio in the game Vitamin Connection. In animation, she voices Marinette Dupain-Cheng/Ladybug in the English dub of Miraculous: Tales of Ladybug & Cat Noir. She was the co-host of AnimeTV with Johnny Yong Bosch and portrayed Haruhi Suzumiya in the live-action The Adventures of the ASOS Brigade. She also voices Verosika Mayday in the web series Helluva Boss and Fwench Fwy in Chikn Nuggit.

Career

Anime
Vee was born with a mixed Mexican, Lebanese, and Native American heritage and raised in the Los Angeles area, growing up in Norwalk. When she was younger she wanted to become an animator, but after watching Sailor Moon, she was inspired to go into voice acting. She had attended Anime Expo multiple times as a fan and participated in their AX Idol voice-over contest. In 2004, she joined a voice-over panel where she helped work some of the equipment and then got a card from Wendee Lee to audition for several shows with Bang Zoom! Entertainment, including Samurai Champloo. Her first major role was Kanaria in Rozen Maiden. She studied Theatre Arts and graduated from California State University at Long Beach in 2007. In 2008, she voiced the title character in Aika R-16: Virgin Mission, Louise in The Familiar of Zero, and Nanoha in Magical Girl Lyrical Nanoha. She portrayed the live-action Haruhi Suzumiya in the promotional videos for the second The Melancholy of Haruhi Suzumiya series, and performed as her at various events.

In 2011, she voiced the shy bassist Mio Akiyama in the school music comedy K-On! and Nagisa Saitō in the comedy Squid Girl. That year, she starred in the anime feature film Tekken: Blood Vengeance as Alisa Bosconovitch, attending American anime conventions with the Japanese writer Dai Satō to promote the film. In 2012, she voiced Homura Akemi in Puella Magi Madoka Magica. In 2013, she voiced Princess Yo in Nura: Rise of the Yokai Clan and Red Hood in the Ikki Tousen series. In 2014, she voiced Morgiana in Magi: The Labyrinth of Magic and the Honoka sisters in Knights of Sidonia. She was chosen to voice Sailor Mars in Viz's re-dub of Sailor Moon and the new Sailor Moon Crystal series. Vee described her voicing of Rei as different in Crystal because her character is more serious and regal compared to her character in the original series.

In 2015, she voiced Noel Vermillion in BlazBlue Alter Memory, Compa in Hyperdimension Neptunia: The Animation, and Hawk in The Seven Deadly Sins, the last of which was released as a Netflix original series. In 2016, she provided the voice of Killua Zoldyck in the Viz Media English dub of the 2011 anime adaptation of Hunter × Hunter. In 2021, she voiced Vivy in the Bang Zoom! Entertainment English dub of the original anime series Vivy: Fluorite Eye's Song.

Animation projects
Vee has been involved in several animation projects. In March 2012, she started a Kickstarter crowdfunding campaign to produce an animated music video in conjunction with Cybergraphix Animation and Studio APPP. The main character of the video, "Cristina Veecaloid", was designed by Skullgirls creative director Alex Ahad, Her character was later named Milky and was made into an iOS game called Veecaloid Pop released in 2015. In 2012, Vee was involved in voice casting and directing the Skullgirls video game and web series. The game was nominated at the 40th Annie Awards. In 2015, Vee landed the English voice role of title character Marinette Dupain-Cheng (aka Ladybug) in the CGI animated series Miraculous: Tales of Ladybug & Cat Noir. The show premiered on Nickelodeon in December 2015, and has aired four seasons on Netflix and now Disney+ & Disney Channel. Executive producer Jared Wolfsen said that Vee and the other English dub voice actors brought a lot of energy to their characters, and that Vee herself is just like Ladybug – sweet and kind, and so fun to watch. In February 2021, Vee voiced a character named Verosika Mayday in the web series Helluva Boss and stars in episodes "Spring Broken", “Truth Seekers”, and "Ozzie's".

Video games, hosting, and other projects
Vee has been involved in voice-overs for video games, mostly with English localizations of Japanese titles produced by Atlus USA and NIS America. Some of her major roles are Noel Vermillion in BlazBlue, Velvet Crowe in Tales of Berseria, Riven the Exile in League of Legends, Four in Drakengard 3, Compa in Hyperdimension Neptunia, 13-Amp and 5-Volt in WarioWare Gold, Marnie in Pokémon Masters EX, 
Ying in Paladins: Champions of the Realm, the title character of the Shantae series, said title character's arch-nemesis Risky Boots, as well as Bennett and Xingqiu in Genshin Impact. She has directed and produced the voices for the video game Indivisible which was crowdfunded with a total amount of $1.5 million on December 2, 2015.

In addition to being a live-action Haruhi Suzumiya, Vee has appeared on screen on various web series, television shows and events. She was a host on Anime TV where she reviewed shows and interviewed people, and appeared on Funimation On Demand and Crunchyroll. She was a live-action host of IGN's IPL4 and IPL5 League of Legends video game tournaments in Las Vegas. She is a frequent guest at many anime conventions throughout the United States and worldwide.

Music
Vee is also a professional singer, and has performed the theme songs for two Shantae video games: "Dance Through the Danger" for 2016's Shantae: Half-Genie Hero and "Rise and Shine Shantae" for 2019's Shantae and the Seven Sirens. She also performed the theme song "Until I'm Broken" for the 2012 visual novel Loren the Amazon Princess.

Vee has uploaded several renditions of anime songs on YouTube. In 2015, she released an EP called Menagerie with DJ Bouche which was part of the Viewster's Omakase subscription service. She and YouTuber Nathan Sharp (NateWantsToBattle) released a cover of Charlie Puth's song "Attention" in August 2017. She also signed with an indie record label called Give Heart Records.
She also recorded The Living Tombstone's song "Animal" with 'The 8-Bit Big Band' in an arrangement by Charlie Rosen. This can be accessed on YouTube.

Personal life
Vee lives in the Los Angeles area.  In January 2018, she and musician/voice actor Nathan Sharp announced their engagement, but Sharp later announced in August that the two had separated.

As of January 2022, she is engaged to epidemiologist Michael Espero.

Filmography

References

External links

 
 
 
 Cristina Valenzuela at Crystal Acids Voice Actor Database
 

1987 births
Living people
Actresses from Long Beach, California
Actresses from Los Angeles
American television hosts
American film actresses
American television actresses
American video game actresses
American voice actresses
American voice directors
Pixar people
Animal impersonators
Audiobook narrators
American web series actresses
American women television presenters
American women television writers
California State University, Long Beach alumni
People from Long Beach, California
People from Norwalk, California
21st-century American actresses
American bisexual actors
Bisexual actresses